鲁 or 魯 (pinyin: Lǔ) may refer to:

Lu (state) (鲁国/魯國), a state that existed during the Zhou Dynasty in modern Shandong province, China
Official abbreviation for Shandong province, derived from the state
Lu (surname 魯), a common surname derived from the state